State Transport Authority  may refer to:

 State Transport Authority (South Australia)
 State Transport Authority (Victoria)

See also
 State Transit Authority, New South Wales